Itezi is an administrative ward in the Mbeya Urban district of the Mbeya Region of Tanzania. In 2016 the Tanzania National Bureau of Statistics report there were 20,329 people in the ward, from 18,445 in 2012.

Neighborhoods 
The ward has 4 neighborhoods.
 Gombe Kaskazini
 Gombe Kusini
 Itezi Magharibi
 Mwasote

References 

Wards of Mbeya Region